Mont Blanc (both meaning "white mountain") is the highest mountain in the Alps and Western Europe, rising  above sea level, located on the French-Italian border. It is the second-most prominent mountain in Europe, after Mount Elbrus, and it is the eleventh most prominent mountain summit in the world.

It gives its name to the Mont Blanc massif, which straddles parts of France, Italy and Switzerland. Mont Blanc's summit lies on the watershed line between the valleys of Ferret and Veny in Italy, and the valleys of Montjoie, and Arve in France. Ownership of the summit area has long been disputed between France and Italy.

The Mont Blanc massif is popular for outdoor activities like hiking, climbing, trail running and winter sports like skiing, and snowboarding. The most popular climbing route to the summit of Mont Blanc is the Goûter Route, which typically takes two days.

The three towns and their communes which surround Mont Blanc are Courmayeur in Aosta Valley, Italy; and Saint-Gervais-les-Bains and Chamonix in Haute-Savoie, France. The latter town was the site of the first Winter Olympics. A cable car ascends and crosses the mountain range from Courmayeur to Chamonix through the Col du Géant. The  Mont Blanc Tunnel, constructed between 1957 and 1965, runs beneath the mountain and is a major transalpine transport route.

Geology 
Mont Blanc and adjacent mountains in the massif are predominately formed from a large intrusion of granite (termed a batholith) which was forced up through a basement layer of gneiss and mica schists during the Variscan mountain-forming event of the late Palaeozoic period. The summit of Mont Blanc is located at the point of contact of these two rock types. To the south west, the granite contact is of a more intrusive nature, whereas to the north east it changes to being more tectonic. The granites are mostly very-coarse grained, ranging in type from microgranites to porphyroid granites. The massif is tilted in a north-westerly direction and was cut by near-vertical recurrent faults lying in a north–south direction during the Variscan orogeny. Further faulting with shear zones subsequently occurred during the later Alpine orogeny. Repeated tectonic phases have caused breakup of the rock in multiple directions and in overlapping planes. Finally, past and current glaciation caused significant sculpting of the landscape into its present-day form.

The first systematic account of the minerals of the Mont Blanc area was published in 1873 by Venance Payot. His list, entitled "Statistique minéralogique des environs du Mt-Blanc", catalogued 90 mineral types although it also included those present only as very small components of rocks. If these are excluded, it is known today that at least 68 separate mineral species occur across the wider range of the Mont Blanc massif.

Climate

Located on the watershed between the Rhône and the Po, the massif of Mont Blanc is also situated between the two different climatic regions of the northern and western Alps and that of the southern Alps. Climatic conditions on the Mer de Glace are similar to those found on the northern side of the Swiss Alps.

The climate is cold and temperate (Köppen climate classification Cfb), and is greatly influenced by altitude. 
Being the highest part of the Alps, Mont Blanc and surrounding mountains can create their own weather patterns. The summit is also prone to strong winds and sudden weather changes. Because of its great overall height, a considerable proportion is permanently glaciated or snow-covered and is exposed to extremely cold conditions.

There is, however, significant variation in precipitation with altitude.

History 

The Mont Blanc was the highest mountain of the Frankish Empire under Charlemagne and the highest mountain of the Holy Roman Empire until 1792.

In 1760, Swiss naturalist Horace-Bénédict de Saussure began to go to Chamonix to observe Mont Blanc. He tried to summit it with the Courmayeur mountain guide Jean-Laurent Jordaney, a native of Pré-Saint-Didier, who accompanied De Saussure since 1774 on the Miage Glacier and Mont Crammont.

The first recorded ascent of Mont Blanc (at the time neither within Italy nor France) was on 8 August 1786 by Jacques Balmat and the doctor Michel Paccard. This climb, initiated by Horace-Bénédict de Saussure, who rewarded the successful ascent, traditionally marks the start of modern mountaineering. The first woman to reach the summit was Marie Paradis in 1808.

Ownership of the summit 
At the scale of the Mont Blanc massif, the border between Italy and France passes along most of the main Alpine watershed, from the Aiguille des Glaciers to Mont Dolent, where it reaches the border with Switzerland. However, its precise location near the summits of Mont Blanc and nearby Dôme du Goûter has been disputed since the 18th century. Italian officials claim the border follows the watershed, splitting both summits between Italy and France. In contrast, French officials claim the border avoids the two summits, placing them entirely with France. The size of these two (distinct) disputed areas is approximately 65 ha on Mont Blanc and 10 ha on Dôme du Goûter.

Since the French Revolution, the issue of the ownership of the summit has been debated. From 1416 to 1792, the entire mountain was within the Duchy of Savoy. In 1723, the Duke of Savoy, Victor Amadeus II, acquired the Kingdom of Sardinia. The resulting state of Sardinia was to become preeminent in the Italian unification. In September 1792, the French Revolutionary Army of the Alps under Anne-Pierre de Montesquiou-Fézensac seized Savoy without much resistance and created a department of the Mont Blanc. In a treaty of 15 May 1796, Victor Amadeus III of Sardinia was forced to cede Savoy and Nice to France. In article 4 of this treaty, it says: "The border between the Sardinian kingdom and the departments of the French Republic will be established on a line determined by the most advanced points on the Piedmont side, of the summits, peaks of mountains and other locations subsequently mentioned, as well as the intermediary peaks, knowing: starting from the point where the borders of Faucigny, the Duchy of Aoust and the Valais, to the extremity of the glaciers or Monts-Maudits: first the peaks or plateaus of the Alps, to the rising edge of the Col-Mayor". This act further states that the border should be visible from the town of Chamonix and Courmayeur. However, neither is the peak of the Mont Blanc visible from Courmayeur nor is the peak of the Mont Blanc de Courmayeur visible from Chamonix because part of the mountains lower down obscure them.

After the Napoleonic Wars, the Congress of Vienna restored the King of Sardinia in Savoy, Nice, and Piedmont, his traditional territories, overruling the 1796 Treaty of Paris. Forty-five years later, after the Second Italian War of Independence, it was replaced by a new legal act. This act was signed in Turin on 24 March 1860 by Napoleon III and Victor Emmanuel II of Savoy, and deals with the annexation of Savoy (following the French neutrality for the plebiscites held in Tuscany, Modena, Parma and Romagna to join the Kingdom of Sardinia, against the Pope's will). A demarcation agreement, signed on 7 March 1861, defined the new border. With the formation of Italy, for the first time, Mont Blanc was located on the border of France and Italy, along the old border on the watershed between the department of Savoy and that of Piedmont, formerly belonging to the Kingdom of Savoy.

The 1860 act and attached maps are still legally valid for both the French and Italian governments. In the second half of the nineteenth century, on surveys carried out by a cartographer of the French army, Captain JJ Mieulet, a topographic map was published in France, which incorporated the summit into French territory, making the state border deviate from the watershed line, and giving rise to the differences with the maps published in Italy in the same period.

Modern Swiss mapping, published by the Federal Office of Topography, plots a region of disputed territory (statut de territoire contesté) around the summits of both Mont Blanc and the Dôme du Goûter. One of its interpretations of the French-Italian border places both summits straddling a line running directly along the geographic ridgeline (watershed) between France and Italy, thus sharing their summits equally between both states. However, a second interpretation places both summits, as well as that of Mont Blanc de Courmayeur (although much less clearly in the latter case), solely within France.

NATO maps take data from the Italian national mapping agency, the Istituto Geografico Militare, which is based upon past treaties in force.

As of 2021, the border dispute between the two countries is ongoing.

Vallot 

The first professional scientific investigations on the summit were conducted by the botanist–meteorologist Joseph Vallot at the end of the 19th century. He wanted to stay near the top of the summit to undertake detailed research, so he built his permanent cabin.

Janssen observatory 
In 1890, Pierre Janssen, an astronomer and the director of the Meudon astrophysical observatory, considered the construction of an observatory at the summit of Mont Blanc. Consequently, the Eiffel project was abandoned.

Despite this, the observatory was built in 1893.

Levers attached to the ice supported the observatory. This worked to some extent until 1906, when the building started leaning heavily. The movement of the levers corrected the lean slightly, but three years later (two years after Janssen's death), a crevasse started opening under the observatory. It was abandoned. Eventually the building fell, and only the tower could be saved in extremis.

Air crashes 
The mountain was the scene of two fatal air crashes; Air India Flight 245 in 1950 and Air India Flight 101 in 1966. Both planes were approaching Geneva Airport and the pilots miscalculated their descent; 48 and 117 people, respectively, died. The latter passengers included nuclear scientist Homi J. Bhabha, known as the "father" of India's nuclear programme.

Tunnel 

In 1946, a drilling project was initiated to carve a tunnel through the mountain. The Mont Blanc tunnel would connect Chamonix, France, and Courmayeur, Italy, and become one of the major transalpine transport routes between the two countries.

1999 disaster 

In 1999, a transport truck caught fire in the tunnel beneath the mountain. In total, 39 people were killed when the fire raged out of control. The tunnel was renovated in the aftermath to increase driver safety. Renovations include computerised detection equipment, extra security bays, a parallel escape shaft, and a fire station in the middle of the tunnel. The escape shafts also have clean air flowing through them via vents. Any people in the security bays now have live video contact to communicate with the control centre. A remote site for cargo safety inspection was created on each side: Aosta in Italy and Passy-Le Fayet in France. Here all trucks are inspected before entering the tunnel. These remote sites are also used as staging areas to control commercial traffic during peak hours. The renovated tunnel reopened three years after the disaster.

Elevation 

The summit of Mont Blanc is a thick, perennial ice-and-snow dome whose thickness varies. Therefore, no exact and permanent summit elevation can be determined, though accurate measurements have been made on specific dates.
In 2002, the IGN and expert surveyors, with the aid of GPS technology, measured it to be .

After the 2003 heatwave in Europe, a team of scientists remeasured the height on 6 and 7 September. The team was made up of the glaciologist Luc Moreau, two surveyors from the GPS Company, three people from the IGN, seven expert surveyors, four mountain guides from Chamonix and Saint-Gervais and four students from various institutes in France.

After these results were published, more than 500 points were measured to assess the effects of climate change and the mountain's height fluctuations at different points. Since then, the mountain's elevation has been measured every two years.

The summit was measured again in 2005, and the results were published on 16 December 2005. The height was found to be ,  more than the previously recorded height.

From the summit of Mont Blanc on a clear day, the Jura, the Vosges, the Black Forest, and the Massif Central mountain ranges can be seen, as well as the principal summits of the Alps.

Climbing routes 

Several classic climbing routes lead to the summit of Mont Blanc:

The most popular route is the Goûter Route, also known as the Voie Des Cristalliers or the Voie Royale. Starting from Saint-Gervais-les-Bains, the Tramway du Mont-Blanc (TMB) is taken to get to the Gare du Nid d'Aigle. The ascent begins in the direction of the Refuge de Tête Rousse, crossing the Grand Couloir or Goûter Corridor, considered dangerous because of frequent rockfalls, leading to the Goûter Hut for night shelter. The next day the route leads to the Dôme du Goûter, past the emergency Vallot cabin and l'Arête des Bosses.
La Voie des 3 Monts is also known as La Traversée. Starting from Chamonix, the Téléphérique de l'Aiguille du Midi is taken towards the Col du Midi. The Cosmiques Hut is used to spend the night. The next day the ascent continues over Mont Blanc du Tacul and Mont Maudit.
The historic itinerary via the Grands Mulets Hut, or the old normal route on the French side, which is most frequently traversed in winter by ski, or in summer to descend to Chamonix.
The normal Italian itinerary is called La route des Aiguilles Grises. After crossing the Miage Glacier, climbers spend the night at the Gonella refuge. The next day, one proceeds through the Col des Aiguilles Grises and the Dôme du Goûter, concluding at L'arête des Bosses (Bosses ridge).
The Miage – Bionnassay – Mont Blanc crossing is usually done in three days. It has been described as a truly magical expedition of ice and snow arêtes at great altitude. The route begins from Contamines-Montjoie, with the night spent in the Conscrits Hut. The following day, the Dômes de Miages is crossed and the night is spent at the Durier cabin. The third day proceeds over l'Aiguille de Bionnassay and the Dôme du Goûter, finally reaching the summit of Mont Blanc via the Bosses ridge.

Nowadays, the summit is ascended by an average of 20,000 mountaineer tourists each year. It could be considered a technically easy yet arduous ascent for someone well-trained and acclimatised to the altitude. From l'Aiguille du Midi (where the cable car stops), Mont Blanc seems quite close, being  higher. But while the peak looks deceptively close, the La Voie des 3 Monts route (known to be more technical and challenging than other more commonly used routes) requires more ascent over two other  mountains, Mont Blanc du Tacul and Mont Maudit, before the final section of the climb is reached. The last  push to the summit is undertaken.

Each year climbing deaths occur on Mont Blanc. On the busiest weekends, normally around August, the local rescue service performs an average of 12 missions, mostly directed to aid people in trouble on one of the normal routes of the mountain. Some routes require knowledge of high-altitude mountaineering and a guide (or at least an experienced mountaineer), and all require proper equipment. All routes are long and arduous, involving delicate passages and the hazard of rockfall or avalanche. Climbers may also suffer altitude sickness, occasionally life-threatening, particularly if they are not properly acclimatised.

Fatalities 
A 1994 estimate suggests there had been 6,000 to 8,000 alpinist fatalities in total, more than on any other mountain. These numbers exclude the fatalities of Air India Flight 245 and Air India Flight 101, two planes that crashed into Mont Blanc. Despite unsubstantiated claims recurring in media that "some estimates put the fatality rate at an average of 100 hikers a year", actual reported annual numbers at least since the 1990s are between 10 and 20: in 2017, fourteen people died out of 20,000 summit attempts, and two remained missing; with 15 in 2018 as of August.

A French study on the especially risky "Goûter couloir, on the normal route on Mont Blanc" and necessary rescue operations found that, between 1990 and 2011, there were 74 deaths "between the Tête Rousse refuge (3,187 m) and the Goûter refuge (3,830 m)". There were 17 more in 2012–15, none in 2016, and 11 in 2017.

Refuges 
Refuge Vallot, 4362 m
Bivouac Giuseppe Lampugnani, 3860 m
Bivouac Marco Crippa, 3840 m
Refuge Goûter, 3817 m
Bivouac Corrado Alberico – Luigi Borgna, 3684 m
Refuge Cosmiques, 3613 m
Refuge Tête Rousse, 3167 m
Refuge Francesco Gonella, 3071 m
Refuge Grands Mulets, 3050 m

Impacts of climate change 
The recent temperature rises and heatwaves, such as those of the summers of 2015 and 2018, have significantly impacted many climbing routes across the Alps, including those on Mont Blanc. For example, in 2015, the Grand Mulets route, previously popular in the 20th century, was blocked by virtually impenetrable crevasse fields, and the Gouter Hut was closed by municipal decree for some days because of a very high rockfall danger, with some stranded climbers evacuated by helicopter.

In 2016 a crevasse opened at high altitude, also indicating previously unobserved glacial movements. The new crevasse forms an obstacle to be scaled by climbing parties on the final part of the itinerary to the top shared by the popular Goûter Route and the Grand Mulets Route.

Exploits and incidents 

1950: Air India Flight 245 crashes into Mont Blanc.
1966: Air India Flight 101 crashes into Mont Blanc.

11 July 2013: Kilian Jornet beat the fastest overall time for ascent and descent with 4 hours, 57 minutes and 40 seconds.
21 June 2018: Emelie Forsberg set a women's fastest known time up and down from Chamonix with 7 hours 53 minutes and 12 seconds, improving her previous record of 8 hours 10 minutes from 2013.

Incidents involving children 
In July 2014, an American entrepreneur and traveller Patrick Sweeney attempted to break the record with his nine-year-old son and 11-year-old daughter. They were caught in an avalanche, escaped death and decided not to pursue their attempt.

Cultural references

Cinema and television 
La Terre, son visage, is a documentary by Jean-Luc Prévost and published by Édition Société national de télévision française, released in 1984. It is part of the Haroun Tazieff raconte sa terre, vol. 1 series. In it he talks about the west–east crossing of Mont Blanc.
The film Malabar Princess.
The television-film Premier de cordée.
Storm over Mont Blanc (Stürme über dem Mont Blanc, 1930) with Leni Riefenstahl and directed by Arnold Fanck
La Roue (The Wheel, 1923) is a 273-minute film by Abel Gance depicting rail operations, workers, and families in south-eastern France, including the Mont Blanc area.

Literature 
Premier de cordée by Roger Frison-Roche
Hugo et le Mont Blanc by Colette Cosnie – Édition Guérin
Hymn Before Sunrise, in the Vale of Chamouni by Samuel Taylor Coleridge
Manfred by Lord Byron
Frankenstein; or, The Modern Prometheus by Mary Shelley
Mont Blanc by Percy Shelley
Point Blanc by Anthony Horowitz
The Prelude Book VI by William Wordsworth
, by Letitia Elizabeth Landon, a poem to accompany an engraving of a painting by J. M. W. Turner.
Kordian by Juliusz Słowacki
Eiger Dreams: Ventures Among Men and Mountains by Jon Krakauer
Running Water by AEW Mason
La neige en deuil by Henri Troyat

Protection 
The Mont Blanc massif is being put forward as a potential World Heritage Site because of its uniqueness and cultural importance considered the birthplace and symbol of modern mountaineering. It would require the three governments of Italy, France and Switzerland to request UNESCO for it to be listed.

Mont Blanc is one of the most visited tourist destinations in the world. For this reason, some view it as threatened. Pro-Mont Blanc (an international collective of associations for the protection of Mont Blanc) published in 2002 the book Le versant noir du mont Blanc (The black hillside of Mont Blanc), which exposes current and future problems in conserving the site.

In 2007, Europe's two highest toilets (at 4,260 metres, 13,976 feet) were taken by helicopter to the top of Mont Blanc. They are also serviced by helicopter. They will serve 30,000 skiers and hikers annually, helping to alleviate the discharge of urine and faeces that spreads down the mountain face with the spring thaw.

Global warming has begun to melt glaciers and cause avalanches on Mont Blanc, creating more dangerous climbing conditions.

Panorama

See also 

Exploration of the High Alps
Haute Route
Mont Blanc (Moon)
Tête Rousse Glacier
Mont Blanc massif
Mont Blanc Tramway
Mont Blanc Tunnel
Tour du Mont Blanc
Top of the Mont Blanc
List of Alpine four-thousanders

Notes

References

External links 

Topographic map of Mont Blanc: French IGN map, Swiss National Map (showing disputed areas)

Places to visit around Mont Blanc
In-depth guide to Mont Blanc
Mont-Blanc summit webcam: Close up of the summit of the Mont Blanc and its glaciers at 4811m.
Mont-Blanc panoramic webcam: See several points of view of the Mont-Blanc range and zoom on the top.

Mont Blanc on Summitpost
Descent into the Ice Companion website to the PBS NOVA program which follows a glaciologist and a climber into the glacier caves of Mont Blanc
Chamonix-Mont-Blanc Map 
The scientific observatories on Mont Blanc.
Why Is Mont Blanc One of the World's Deadliest Mountains?
Mont Blanc on Peakclimber

 
Mont Blanc
Mont Blanc
Mountains of Aosta Valley
Alpine four-thousanders
Seven Summits
France–Italy border
International mountains of Europe
Highest points of countries